York Central may refer to:

 York Central (development), a brownfield regeneration site next to York railway station in England
 York Central (UK Parliament constituency)
 York Central Market, in York, Pennsylvania, U.S.
 York Central Hospital, now Mackenzie Richmond Hill Hospital, in Richmond Hill, Ontario, Canada

See also
York (disambiguation)
York Centre, a federal electoral district in Ontario, Canada
York Centre (provincial electoral district)